Parliamentary elections were held in Guam in 1933.

Results
Due to the lack of public interest in a Congress whose decisions could be ignored by the Governor, too few candidates ran for election, resulting in twelve seats being unfilled. These seats were filled by candidates nominated by the Governor.

References

1933 in Guam
Legislative elections in Guam
Guam